The women's 400 metres at the 1974 European Athletics Championships was held in Rome, Italy, at Stadio Olimpico on 2, 3, and 4 September 1974.

Medalists

Results

Final
4 September

Semi-finals
3 September

Semi-final 1

Semi-final 2

Heats
2 September

Heat 1

Heat 2

Heat 3

Heat 4

Participation
According to an unofficial count, 23 athletes from 14 countries participated in the event.

 (1)
 (1)
 (1)
 (2)
 (2)
 (1)
 (1)
 (1)
 (1)
 (3)
 (3)
 (3)
 (2)
 (1)

References

400 metres
400 metres at the European Athletics Championships
1974 in women's athletics